Krasnokamensky District is an administrative and municipal district (raion), one of the thirty-one in Zabaykalsky Krai, Russia. It is located in the southeast of the krai, and borders with Priargunsky District in the north, and with Zabaykalsky District in the west. Its administrative center is the town of Krasnokamensk. Population:  9,987 (2002 Census);  The population of Krasnokamensk accounts for 86.2% of the district's total population.

History
The district was established on March 24, 1977.

References

Notes

Sources

Districts of Zabaykalsky Krai
States and territories established in 1977

